Virgilio Mantegazza (30 January 1889 – 3 July 1928) was an Italian fencer. He won a bronze medal in the team épée at the 1924 Summer Olympics.

References

External links
 

1889 births
1928 deaths
Fencers from Milan
Italian male fencers
Italian épée fencers
Olympic fencers of Italy
Fencers at the 1924 Summer Olympics
Olympic bronze medalists for Italy
Olympic medalists in fencing
Medalists at the 1924 Summer Olympics